Nicholas Georg Myburgh (born 14 November 1962) is a South African farmer, lawyer and politician for the Democratic Alliance. He has been a Member of Parliament (MP) since 2021. Myburgh had previously served as the Executive Mayor of the Swellendam Local Municipality from 2011 to 2021.

Early life and education
Myburgh was born in Swellendam on 14 November 1962. He attended Swellendam Primary School, Western Province Preparatory School,and matriculated from Rondebosch Boys' High School in 1980 where he served as head boy. He then studied at Stellenbosch University and earned the degrees BA (Law) and  Bachelor of Laws (LLB). He served on various student bodies, inter alia as vice-chairperson of the university's Students' Representative Council (SRC).

Mayor of Swellendam
Myburgh has been a farmer in Swellendam for more than two decades. He joined the Democratic Alliance and was chosen as the party's mayoral candidate for the Swellendam Local Municipality ahead of the 2011 local government elections. No party won a majority seats on the municipal council and the DA then formed a coalition with the African Christian Democratic Party to govern the municipality. Myburgh was elected as Executive Mayor, succeeding Jan Jansen.

During his first term as mayor, the Swellendam Local Municipality  won the Auditor-General's Special Award for Most Improved Municipality in the Western Cape in 2014 having earned an Unqualified Audit Report in the wake of three consecutive Disclaimers. The municipality received its first clean audit in 2014/15, and retained their Clean Audit status throughout Myburgh's tenure as Mayor. The municipality won the National Govan Mbeki Housing Award for the Best Upgrade of Informal Settlement Programme in South Africa in 2015. In 2016, the municipality  was ranked by 'Good Governance Africa’ and the South African Institute of Race Relations as the country's Number 1 Municipality.

Prior to the 2016 Local Government Elections (LGE), Myburgh was selected to be the DA's mayoral candidate for Swellendam again. The DA won an outright majority on the council, the first time in the municipality's history that a single party had won a majority of seats on the council. Myburgh was re-elected as Executive Mayor.

Myburgh formerly served as chairman of the Swellendam Heritage Association and as the chairman of the DA's Swellendam Constituency Committee, and is currently a member of the Provincial Executive Committee (PEC) of the DA. Myburgh formerly served on the DA's Provincial Disciplinary Committee as well as the Board of Trustees of the Drostdy Museum. 

Myburgh resigned as Executive Mayor and as a Councillor on 7 September 2021. Member of the Mayoral Committee (MMC) and the DA's mayoral candidate for the 2021 Local Government Elections Francois Du Rand was elected to replace him as mayor.

Parliamentary career
Myburgh had stood unsuccessfully for election to the National Assembly in 2019. In September 2021, the DA announced that Myburgh would take up ex-DA MP Phumzile van Damme's seat in the National Assembly. He was sworn in on 8 September 2021, and serves on the Portfolio Committee for Water and Sanitation.

Myburgh delivered his Maiden Speech on Friday 13 May 2022 during a virtual session of Parliament. He pointed out that the looming water crisis in the country is potentially far more serious than the failure of Escom, the state-owned national electricity supply company. He said "the DA wants the Department of Water & Sanitation to succeed because we want South Africa to succeed!". He concluded his speech by saying that the best investment the government can make is to ensure that every household and business in the country has reliable access to potable water.

Personal life
Myburgh is married to Sally. They have two sons and two daughters.

References

External links

Afrikaner people
People from Swellendam
1962 births
Living people
Stellenbosch University alumni
20th-century South African lawyers
21st-century South African politicians
South African farmers
Democratic Alliance (South Africa) politicians
Members of the National Assembly of South Africa
Mayors of places in South Africa